Björn Olof Gustaf Brandberg (born 26 March 1986) is a Swedish curler.

Teams

References

External links

Living people
1986 births
Swedish male curlers